The 1996 season was the Philadelphia Eagles' 64th in the National Football League (NFL). The team matched their 10–6 record from the previous season and qualified for the playoffs for the second year in a row.

After a season-ending injury to Rodney Peete, Ty Detmer took over the starting role. For the second time in three seasons, the Eagles were 7–2 at the nine-game mark, thanks to a thrilling win November 3 on the road against Dallas. The capper to that contest was a combined 104-yard interception return between James Willis and Troy Vincent in the final moments which turned a potential game-winning drive by the Cowboys into a Philadelphia victory.

As in 1994 under Rich Kotite, the Eagles wilted. This time four losses in five games, including an embarrassing 27-point setback on national TV at Indianapolis, had the team scrambling in the playoff picture. However, wins against the Jets and Cardinals managed to right the ship, and a wild-card matchup with the San Francisco 49ers was the reward. However, the Eagles' season would end in San Francisco with a 14–0 first-round loss to the 49ers.

The 1996 season was also the first season the Eagles debuted the midnight green, white, and black look, with new helmet designs and the logo and endzone font as well.

Offseason 
The Eagles held training camp for the first year at Lehigh University in Bethlehem, Pennsylvania, home of the Lehigh Mountain Hawks.

The Eagles signed college free agent Hollis Thomas, a defensive tackle out of Northern Illinois.

The Eagles signed former Miami Dolphins cornerback Troy Vincent as a free agent.

Veteran San Francisco 49ers offensive tackle Steve Wallace was signed via free agency to a one-year contract, but after a poor showing in the preseason was cut at the end of training camp and promptly re-signed by the 49ers.

NFL draft 
The 1996 NFL Draft was held April 20–21, 1996. No teams elected to claim any players in the supplemental draft that year.

With a 10–6 record in 1995, and tying with two other teams, the Eagles would rotate picking between the 23rd pick to the 25th pick in the 7 rounds. They would choose 8 players in the 6 rounds they had picks. With their first pick in the draft, the Eagles would take Jermane Mayberry an Offensive Tackle out of Texas A&M-Kingsville

The table shows the Eagles selections and what picks they had that were traded away and the team that ended up with that pick. It is possible the Eagles' pick ended up with this team via another team that the Eagles made a trade with.
Not shown are acquired picks that the Eagles traded away.

Staff

Roster

Regular season

Schedule 

Note: Intra-division opponents are in bold text.

Game summaries

Week 10

Standings

Playoffs

References

External links 
 1996 Philadelphia Eagles at Pro-Football-Reference.com

Philadelphia Eagles seasons
Philadelphia Eagles
Philadelphia Eagles